Iliamna bakeri is an uncommon species of flowering plant in the mallow family known by the common names Baker's globe mallow and Baker's wild hollyhock.

It is endemic to northeastern California and southeastern Oregon. It grows in the Southern Cascade Range and Modoc Plateau forests and woodlands on volcanic soils.

Description
It produces rough-haired, three-pointed leaves on thick petioles, each  centimeters long.

The fruit is a small, bristly capsule.

Conservation
This species is endangered on the state level in Oregon. Threats to its existence include wildland fire suppression and forest habitat destruction by human activity such as logging.

References

External links
Jepson Manual Treatment
USDA Plants Profile

Malveae
Flora of California
Flora of Oregon
Flora of the Cascade Range
~
Endemic flora of the United States
Flora without expected TNC conservation status